Trichosternus is a genus of beetles in the family Carabidae and if found in Japan and Australia. The genus contains the following species:

 Trichosternus angulosus Chaudoir, 1878
 Trichosternus fax Darlington, 1962
 Trichosternus fisheri Darlington, 1962
 Trichosternus frater Darlington, 1962
 Trichosternus montorum Darlington, 1962
 Trichosternus mutatus Darlington, 1962
 Trichosternus nudipes Darlington, 1962
 Trichosternus perater Sloane, 1923
 Trichosternus relictus Darlington, 1953
 Trichosternus renardi (Chaudoir, 1865)
 Trichosternus simplicipes Sloane, 1923
 Trichosternus soror Darlington, 1953
 Trichosternus subvirens (Chaudoir, 1865)
 Trichosternus vigorsi (Gory, 1833)

References

Pterostichinae